The Men's 800 metre freestyle competition at the 2022 World Aquatics Championships was held on 20 and 21 June 2022.

Records
Prior to the competition, the existing world and championship records were as follows.

Results

Heats
The heats were started on 20 June at 09:57.

Final
The final was held on 21 June at 18:02.

References

Men's 800 metre freestyle